Mahmoud Ahmadinejad was the sixth President of Iran which governed during his second term within the tenth Government of Islamic Republic of Iran.

2009 appointments 
President Ahmadinejad announced controversial ministerial appointments for his second term. Esfandiar Rahim Mashaei was briefly appointed as first vice president, but opposed by a number of Majlis members and by the intelligence minister, Gholam-Hossein Mohseni-Eje'i. Mashaei followed orders to resign. Ahmadinejad then appointed Mashaei as chief of staff, and fired Mohseni-Eje'i.

On 26 July 2009, Ahmadinejad's government faced a legal problem after he sacked four ministers. Iran's constitution (Article 136) stipulates that, if more than half of its members are replaced, the cabinet may not meet or act before the Majlis approves the revised membership. The Vice Chairman of the Majlis announced that no cabinet meetings or decisions would be legal, pending such a reapproval.

The main list of 21 cabinet appointments was announced on 19 August 2009. On 4 September, Parliament of Iran approved 18 of the 21 candidates and rejected three of them, including two women. Sousan Keshavarz, Mohammad Aliabadi, and Fatemeh Ajorlou were not approved by Parliament for the Ministries of Education, Energy, and Welfare and Social Security respectively. Marzieh Vahid-Dastjerdi won approval as health minister, making her Iran's first woman minister since the Islamic revolution.

2011 merges and dismissals 
On 9 May, Ahmedinejad announced Ministries of Petroleum and Energy would merge, as would Industries and Mines with Commerce, and Welfare with Labour. On 13 May, he dismissed Masoud Mir-Kazemi (Minister of Petroleum), Ali Akbar Mehrabian (Minister Industry and Mines) and Sadegh Mahsouli (Minister of Welfare). On 15 May, he was announced he would be caretaker minister of the Petroleum Ministry. 

From August 2009 to February 2013, a total of nine ministers in the cabinet was dismissed by the Majlis, the last of who was labor minister, Reza Sheykholeslam at the beginning of February 2013.

Cabinet 
The cabinet included the following members:

|-
!colspan=7|
|-

See also 

 Presidency of Mahmoud Ahmadinejad

References 

2009 establishments in Iran
2013 disestablishments in Iran
Iran
Iran
Ahmadinejad
Presidency of Mahmoud Ahmadinejad